Enyo cavifer is a species of moth in the family Sphingidae. It was described by Rothschild and Jordan, in 1903.

Distribution 
It is found from Central America (including Mexico and Belize south) to Guatemala, Costa Rica, Venezuela, French Guiana, Brazil, Peru, Bolivia and Colombia.

Description 
The wingspan is 60–62 mm.

Biology 
Adults are probably on wing in two to three generations per year. They have been recorded from May to June, August to September and from December to January in Costa Rica, in February in French Guiana and in January in Peru.

The larvae feed on Cissus aff. biformifolia, Vitis tiliifolia and other Vitaceae species.

References

Enyo (moth)
Moths described in 1903
Moths of South America